{{Infobox film
| name           = The Killer That Stalked New York
| image          = The Killer That Stalked New York movieposter.jpg
| image_size     =
| alt            =
| caption        = Theatrical release poster
| director       = Earl McEvoy
| producer       = Robert Cohn
| screenplay     = Harry Essex
| based_on       = {{based on|"Smallpox, the Killer That Stalks New York"1948 Cosmopolitan article|Milton Lehman}}
| narrator       = Reed Hadley
| starring       = Evelyn KeyesCharles KorvinWilliam Bishop
| music          = Hans J. Salter(as Hans Salter)
| cinematography = Joseph F. Biroc(as Joseph Biroc)
| editing        = Jerome Thoms
| studio         = Robert Cohn Productions
| distributor    = Columbia Pictures
| released       = 
| runtime        = 79 minutes76 minutes(Encore-Mystery Library Print)
| country        = United States
| language       = English
| budget         =
}}The Killer That Stalked New York (also known as Frightened City) is a 1950 American film noir directed by Earl McEvoy and starring Evelyn Keyes, Charles Korvin and William Bishop. The film, shot on location and in a semi-documentary style, is about diamond smugglers who unknowingly start a smallpox outbreak in the New York City of 1947. It is based on the real threat of a smallpox epidemic in the city, as described in a story taken from a 1948 Cosmopolitan magazine article.

Plot
Arriving at New York City's Pennsylvania Station after a trip to Cuba, Sheila Bennet (Evelyn Keyes), who is smuggling $50,000 worth of diamonds into the country, realizes she is being followed by the authorities. She mails the diamonds to her husband, Matt Krane (Charles Korvin), instead of carrying them around, and then tries to shake the Treasury agent following her.

Feeling sick, Sheila nearly faints on the street, so a police officer takes her to a local clinic. While there, she encounters a little girl and inadvertently infects her. Sheila is misdiagnosed as having a common cold, and she leaves and returns home. After the girl is admitted to the hospital, she is found to have smallpox.

Meanwhile, Matt has been cheating on Sheila with her sister, Francie (Lola Albright), and then attempts to take off without either of them when the diamonds finally arrive through the mail. However, the fence cannot buy the diamonds because the police are searching for them. Matt will have to wait for ten days for the cash, so he cannot leave New York. Sheila confronts Francie, who kills herself afterward due to Matt's betrayal of them both. This gives Sheila more reason to get revenge on him.

Finding a growing number of smallpox victims, city officials decide to vaccinate everyone in New York to prevent an epidemic, but quickly run out of serum.  This causes a panic in the city.  Tracking the victims, agents realize that the disease carrier and the diamond smuggler are one and the same.  However, an increasingly sick Sheila continues to elude capture.  Still unaware that she has smallpox, she returns to the doctor at the clinic to get more medicine. The doctor explains her illness and tries to talk her into turning herself in, but she shoots him in the shoulder and escapes.

Sheila eventually catches up with Matt, who tries to escape from the police, but falls from a building ledge to his death. Sheila nearly attempts to drop herself from the ledge, until the doctor tells her the little girl she met had died.  Sheila turns herself in and, before succumbing to the disease, provides authorities information on those she had contacted.

Cast
 Evelyn Keyes as Sheila Bennet
 Charles Korvin as Matt Krane
 William Bishop as Dr. Ben Wood
 Dorothy Malone as Alice Lorie
 Lola Albright as Francie Bennet
 Barry Kelley as Treasury Agent Johnson
 Carl Benton Reid as Health Commissioner Ellis
 Ludwig Donath as Dr. Cooper
 Art Smith as Anthony Moss
 Whit Bissell as Sid Bennet
 Roy Roberts as Mayor of New York
 Connie Gilchrist as Belle – the Landlady
 Dan Riss as Skrip
 Harry Shannon as Police Officer Houlihan
 Jim Backus as Willie Dennis, the nightclub owner

Reception

Critical responseThe New York Times film critic, Bosley Crowther, gave the film a mixed review, writing, "But, unfortunately, the script of Harry Essex, based on a factual magazine piece, has a bad tendency to ramble and to confuse two separate hunts. And the performances of the principal characters, while adequate, have little punch. Evelyn Keyes, as the fugitive smallpox carrier, manifests great discomfort and distress, but she is no more than a melodramatic cipher in a loosely organized 'chase.' William Bishop is blankly youthful as the physician and Charles Korvin is conventional as the lady's no-good husband who tries to give her the brush. Others are moderately effective in a potentially but not sufficiently intriguing film."

Film critic Dennis Schwartz gave the film a mixed review as well and wrote, "There's not much in the way of thrills or surprises in this minor film noir ... The action part of the melodramatic story was weakly told, while the noir characterizations of Sheila did capture the desperate feelings of the subject but it was not enough to overcome the overall inability of the story to have a heart to it. The city officials and Dr. Wood running around the city to stem the epidemic, seemed hard to fathom. The mechanical acting by everyone, except for Keyes, and the unconvincing action scenes made the film appear as the B film it was, despite the great noir camerawork of Joseph Biroc who caught how dark the city could be for someone on-the-run."

See also
 Panic in the Streets, a 1950 film about pneumonic plague spread by criminals in New Orleans
 80,000 Suspects, a 1963 film of smallpox in Bath, England
 Variola Vera'', a 1972 film of outbreak of smallpox in Yugoslavia.

References

External links
 
 
 
 
 The Killer That Stalked New York article at Film Noir of the Week by Sheila O'Malley
 

1950 films
1950s psychological thriller films
American black-and-white films
Columbia Pictures films
Film noir
Films about viral outbreaks
Films set in New York City
Smallpox in fiction
Smallpox in the United States
Films scored by Hans J. Salter
American psychological thriller films
Films directed by Earl McEvoy
1950s English-language films
1950s American films